Gávavencsellő is a village in Szabolcs-Szatmár-Bereg county, in the Northern Great Plain region of eastern Hungary. The village was established in 1971 by merging the former separate villages of Gáva and Vencsellő.

Geography

History

In 1898 Rabbi Tzvi Hirsh Friedlander became the village chief rabbi; until he got promoted as the chief rabbi of Liska, When his father Rabbi Chaim Friedlander died in 1906. Rav Tzvi Hirsh established a yeshiva, where about 40-60 students learned.

Rabbi Chaim said about his son becoming chief rabbi of Gava: "He is rav of Gava (=the city), but gava he does not possess".

Notable residents
 András Kozák, film actor
 László Karakó, politician
 Theodore S. Weiss, politician
 László Vágner, footballer

Populated places in Szabolcs-Szatmár-Bereg County